Józef Huczek (16 March 1935 – 3 January 1972) was a Polish ski jumper. He competed in the individual event at the 1956 Winter Olympics.

References

1935 births
1972 deaths
Polish male ski jumpers
Olympic ski jumpers of Poland
Ski jumpers at the 1956 Winter Olympics
Sportspeople from Bielsko-Biała